Grigore Cazacliu (January 25, 1892 – December 27, 1959) was a Romanian politician from Bessarabia, and a member of Sfatul Țării.

Biography
He was born in Cușelăuca, Soroksky Uyezd, Bessarabia Governorate. Cazacliu served as Member of the Sfatul Țării (the Parliament of Bessarabia) in 1917–1918, a student at the time. The Cazacliu family played an important role in the Great Union; Ion Cazacliu was Grigore's uncle, and Vladimir Cazacliu was his brother. Vladimir and Grigore Cazacliu were the sons of Alexandru and Evdochia Cazacliu; they also had a brother, Ioan, and a sister, Ludmila.

Grigore Cazacliu died in Bucharest, at age 67.

Gallery

Bibliography 
Gheorghe E. Cojocaru, Sfatul Țării: itinerar, Civitas, Chișinău, 1998, 
Mihai Tașcă, Sfatul Țării și actualele autorități locale, Timpul de dimineață, no. 114 (849), June 27, 2008 (page 16)

External links 
 Arhiva pentru Sfatul Țării
 Deputații Sfatului Țării și Lavrenti Beria

Notes

1892 births
1959 deaths
People from Șoldănești District
People from Soroksky Uyezd
Moldovan MPs 1917–1918
Romanian people of Moldovan descent